Francisca Chepkurui, HSC (born 11 September 1963) is a retired Kenyan middle-distance runner. She won the gold medal in the 400 metres at the 1987 All-Africa Games in Nairobi. Later in those games she anchored Kenya to a silver medal in set the 4 × 400 metres relay, setting a still-standing Kenyan record of 3:28.94.

She did not advance to the finals in either event.

In 1988, Chepkurui moved up to the 800 metres, culminating in August with a 1:58.1 hand-timed personal best which at the time was a Kenyan record and African record. Her national record stood until 2007. She was viewed as a gold medal favorite for the 1988 Summer Olympics, but she was withdrawn from competition before the Games started. The IAAF does not list any results for Chepkurui past 1988.

References

1963 births
Kenyan female sprinters
Kenyan female middle-distance runners
Living people
African Games gold medalists for Kenya
African Games medalists in athletics (track and field)
Athletes (track and field) at the 1987 All-Africa Games